The 596th Bomb Squadron is an inactive United States Air Force unit.  It was last assigned to the 2d Operations Group at Barksdale Air Force Base, Louisiana on 1 October 1993.

History

World War II
The squadron was established at MacDill Field, Florida in April 1943 as one of the original squadrons of the 397th Bombardment Group, a B-26 Marauder medium bomber group. It drew its initial cadre from the 21st Bombardment Group. The squadron trained under Third Air Force at stations in the southeastern United States. After completing its training by participating in the Tennessee Maneuvers, the squadron departed Hunter Field, Georgia for the European Theater of Operations on 13 March 1944.

The squadron was temporarily stationed at RAF Gosfield upon its arrival in England in early April 1944.  On the 15th of the month, its parent group displaced the 363d Fighter Group at RAF Rivenhall and flew its first combat mission five days later. In preparation for Operation Overlord, the invasion of Normandy, the squadron attacked V-1 flying bomb launch pads, bridges, coastal defenses, marshalling yards and airfields in northern France.  On D-Day the squadron attacked strong points and bombed fuel dumps and other objectives to support ground forces throughout the Normandy Campaign.

In July 1944, the squadron attacked German forces near St Lo, France, during the Allied breakout there.  In August, the squadron moved from England to Gorges Airfield, an Advanced Landing Ground in France.  From there it attacked naval targets at Saint Malo and Brest.  Once on the Continent, the squadron made frequent moves forward as the Allied forces advanced during the Northern France Campaign. By September the squadron began flying missions into Germany, attacking depots and defended areas.

During the Battle of the Bulge, the squadron struck enemy lines of communications.  On 23 December 1944 the unit severed a railway bridge at Ediger-Eller, Germany, despite heavy flak and fighter opposition from the Luftwaffe.  For this action it was awarded a Distinguished Unit Citation.  The squadron continued to fly missions to support the Allied drive into Germany until 20 April 1945, exactly one year after its first combat mission, having completed 239 combat missions.

After V-E Day the squadron returned to its former base at Peronne Airfield, France, and remained there until December, when it returned to the United States.  Upon arrival at Camp Shanks, New York in early January 1946, the squadron was inactivated.

B-52 era
The squadron was reactivated as a Strategic Air Command Boeing B-52G Stratofortress intercontinental strategic bombardment squadron in 1963 as part of SAC program to provide Major Command controlled units with a combat lineage. It assumed the mission, personnel, and equipment of the 341st Bombardment Squadron, which was inactivated.  It carried out operational training missions with the 397th Bombardment Wing at Dow Air Force Base, Maine until April 1968, when the 397th was inactivated in preparation for the turnover of Dow to the Maine Air National Guard.

The squadron moved to Barksdale Air Force Base where it was assigned to the 2d Bombardment Wing. For a year and a half, from the end of May 1972 until late October 1972, the squadron was not operational. Between The squadron deployed aircraft and personnel to the 801st Bombardment Wing (Provisional), Morón Air Base, Spain and augmented the 1708th Bombardment Wing, Provisional at Prince Abdullah Air Base, Saudi Arabia, from August 1990 to March 1991 in support of Operation Desert Storm.   The 596th was inactivated and transferred its personnel and equipment to the 96th Bomb Squadron on 1 October 1993.

Lineage
 Constituted as the  596th Bombardment Squadron (Medium) on 20 March 1943
 Redesignated 596th Bombardment Squadron, Medium c. April 1944
 Activated on 20 April 1943
 Inactivated on 31 December 1945
 Redesignated 596th Bombardment Squadron, Heavy and activated on 15 November 1962 (not organized)
 Organized on 1 February 1963
 Redesignated 596th Bomb Squadron on 1 September 1991
 Inactivated on 1 October 1993

Assignments
 397th Bombardment Group, 20 April 1943 – 31 December 1945
 Strategic Air Command, 15 November 1962 (not organized)
 397th Bombardment Wing, 1 February 1963 (attached to 2d Bombardment Wing after 15 April 1968)
 2d Bombardment Wing, 25 April 1968
 2d Operations Group, 1 September 1991 – 1 October 1993

Stations

 MacDill Field, Florida, 20 April 1943
 Avon Park Army Air Field, Florida, 14 October 1943
 Hunter Field, Georgia, 1 November 1943 – 13 March 1944
 RAF Gosfield (Station 154), England, 5 April 1944
 RAF Rivenhall (Station 168), England, 15 April 1944
 RAF Hurn (AAF-492), England, 4 August 1944
 Gorges Airfield (A-26), France, 30 August 1944
 Dreux/Vernouillet Airfield (A-41), France, c. 16 September 1944
 Peronne Airfield (A-72), France, c. 8 October 1944
 Venlo Airfield (Y-55), Netherlands, 25 April 1945
 Peronne Airfield (A-72), France, 30 May – c. December 1945
 Camp Kilmer, New Jersey, 30 – 31 December 1945
 Dow Air Force Base, Maine, 1 February 1963
 Barksdale Air Force Base, Louisiana, 25 April 1968 -1 October 1993

Aircraft
 Martin B-26 Marauder, 1943–1945
 Boeing B-52 Stratofortress, 1963–1993

See also
 List of B-52 Units of the United States Air Force
 List of Martin B-26 Marauder operators

References

Notes

Citations

Bibliography

 
 
 
 
 
 

Bombardment squadrons of the United States Air Force
Units and formations of Strategic Air Command